On 12 July 2019, four al-Shabaab gunmen attacked the Asasey Hotel in Kismayo, Jubaland, Somalia, after the other attacker breached the gate with a car bomb.

Incident 
The attack began on the night of 12 July 2019 when a suicide car bomb destroyed the entrance gate at the Asasey Hotel, allowing at least four gunmen to enter the building. The siege continued for fourteen hours.

At least four al-Shabab assailants attacked the hotel were shot dead by responding police and military.

Victims
A prominent Somali Canadian social media activist, Hodan Nalayeh, and her husband were killed after deciding to take a vacation in Somalia, as was a Somali Broadcasting Corporation photographer, Mohamed Salal Omar, who was there photographing carpets, and tried to capture his killers on camera; Mohamed Ga'anadhere, a journalist for SBC TV; Presidential candidate for upcoming Jubaland elections Mohamed Ismaael; Abdifatah Mohamed from Somalia office of the United Nations International Organization for Migration; philanthropist Mahad Nur Gurguurte; SADO Somalia executive director Abdullahi Isse Abdulle; and Lawmaker and Minister President of Jubaland Mohamed Ismail Shuriye.

Several tribal leaders, a regional presidential candidate, a member of parliament and his wife, three Kenyans, three Tanzanians, two Americans and a Briton are among the dead. Three gunmen were shot to death by security guards.

Perpetrators

The Islamist terrorist group al-Shabaab took responsibility for the attack, via a statement which said the attack targeted Jubaland ministers, federal and regional lawmakers and candidates staying at the hotel. The group frequently targets hotels in Mogadishu, often using similar methods as the July 2019 attack.

Reactions 
The United Nations and multiple countries condemned the attacks, many issuing statements; a United States State Department spokesperson stating, "We send our sincere condolences to the friends and families of the victims killed in the attacks in Kismayo and wish the injured a speedy recovery."

The Special Representative of the Chairperson of the African Union Commission for Somalia, claimed that the attacks were due to the "great strides" the country was making in "taking back territory from the terrorist group" and the attacks were "meant to undermine that process."

References 

2019 mass shootings in Africa
2019 murders in Somalia
21st-century mass murder in Somalia
Al-Shabaab (militant group) attacks
Attacks on buildings and structures in 2019
Attacks on buildings and structures in Somalia
Attacks on hotels in Africa
Islamic terrorism in Somalia
Islamic terrorist incidents in 2019
July 2019 crimes in Africa
Kismayo
Mass murder in 2019
Mass murder in Somalia
Mass shootings in Somalia
Suicide bombings in 2019
Suicide car and truck bombings in Somalia
Terrorist incidents in Somalia in 2019
Somali Civil War (2009–present)
Building bombings in Somalia
Hotel bombings